Kozarišče (in older sources Kozaršče) is a village south of Stari Trg pri Ložu in the Municipality of Loška Dolina in the Inner Carniola region of Slovenia. The area of the village extends south of the main settlement right to the Snežnik Plateau and to the border with Croatia. Snežnik Castle, a 13th-century castle, is located just southwest of the village.

Church

The local church in the settlement dates to the mid-16th century and is dedicated to Saint Benedict and belong to the Parish of Stari Trg pri Ložu.

Mass graves
Kozarišče is the site of a two known mass graves associated with the Second World War. The Kozlovka Cave Mass Grave is located in a spruce woods along the road from Kozarišče to Knežak. The Grobnica Mass Grave is located in the forest southwest of the settlement. It contains an undetermined number of victims.

References

External links

Kozarišče on Geopedia

Populated places in the Municipality of Loška Dolina